Cantal is an unincorporated community, within the Rural Municipality of Reciprocity No. 32, Saskatchewan, Canada. The community is located 4 km north of Highway 361 on Range Road 340, (49.433998, -101.934873) approximately 103 km east of the city of Estevan.  Farming and oil are the major local industries.

Gallery 
A gallery of photos from Cantal, Saskatchewan

See also 
 List of communities in Saskatchewan
 Block settlement

References

External links 

Reciprocity No. 32, Saskatchewan
Unincorporated communities in Saskatchewan
Division No. 1, Saskatchewan